Sand River may refer to:

Canada
 Sand River (Alberta), a tributary of the Beaver River
 Sand River (Vancouver Island), a river of British Columbia
 Sand River (Nova Scotia), a protected area of Nova Scotia
 Sand River, Nova Scotia, a community at the mouth of the river
 Sand River (Ontario)

South Africa
 Sand River (Limpopo), a tributary of the Limpopo
 Sand River (Free State), a tributary of the Vet, renowned because of the Sand River Convention
 Sand River (Mokolo), which becomes the Mokolo River
 Sand River (Mpumalanga), a tributary of the Sabie River

United States
 Sand River (Michigan), a tributary of Lake Superior in Onota Township, Alger County
 Sand River, Michigan. an unincorporated community at the mouth of the river
 Sand River (Wisconsin), a river of Wisconsin